Montréal–Saint-Louis was a former provincial electoral district in the Montreal region of Quebec, Canada that elected members to the Legislative Assembly of Quebec.

It was created for the 1912 election from part of Montréal division no. 3 electoral district.  Its final election was in 1962.  It disappeared in the 1966 election and its successor electoral district was Saint-Louis.

Members of the Legislative Assembly
 Godfroy Langlois, Liberal (1912–1916)
 Peter Bercovitch, Liberal (1916–1938)
 Louis Fitch, Union Nationale (1938–1939)
 Maurice Hartt, Liberal (1939–1948)
 Dave Rochon, Liberal (1948–1960)
 Harry Blank, Liberal (1960–1966)

Partial election results

References
 Election results (National Assembly)
 Election results (QuebecPolitique.com)

Former provincial electoral districts of Quebec